A date square is a Canadian dessert or bar cookie made of cooked dates with an oatmeal crumb topping. In Ohio it is known as matrimonial cake. In Eastern Canada it can also be known as date crumbles. It is often found in coffee shops as a sweet snack food. Sometimes nuts are added to the base layer or crumb topping, or other alterations. There can also be candied peel added to the date stuffing for a contrasting texture.

History

The date square is known as a traditional dish of Newfoundland.

See also
 List of desserts
 Canadian cuisine
 List of cakes

References

Canadian desserts
Cuisine of Newfoundland and Labrador
Date dishes